The 1984 Chesterfield by-election was held on 1 March 1984 for a seat in the House of Commons of the United Kingdom to represent Chesterfield in Derbyshire. This followed the resignation of the sitting Labour Member of Parliament (MP) Eric Varley.

The eventual winner, former Labour cabinet minister Tony Benn (who had been ousted from parliament at the general election nine months earlier) defeated sixteen other candidates, at the time the largest fielded in a British by-election — surpassing the previous high of twelve, at the 1981 Croydon North West by-election. This record would remain unbroken until the 1993 Newbury by-election.

At the time, there was no requirement for political parties fielding candidates to be registered, resulting in some fringe candidates using slogans or frivolous titles as their party name. Actor Bill Maynard finished in fourth place, standing as an "independent Labour" supporter who opposed Benn's candidacy. Other candidates included: John Davey, who ran in opposition to increases in the charges for NHS dentistry, Helen Anscomb, a by-election veteran who called for freight to be transported by rail to improve road safety, Donald Butler, a furniture shop owner who adopted the slogan "a Chesterfield for Chesterfield", Giancarlo Piccaro stood for the 'Official Acne Party', pretending to be dedicated to the eradication of zits worldwide, T. A. Layton stood in the name of the "Spare the Earth Ecology Party", which he had founded, and David Cahill campaigned for The Sun to be treated as a comic.

Chesterfield was Benn's fourth by-election victory. He had first entered Parliament at the 1950 Bristol South East by-election and held that seat until he was disqualified from the Commons in 1960, when he inherited a peerage, as Viscount Stansgate, upon his father's death. At the resulting Bristol South East by-election 1961, he won with an increased majority of votes, but because he was ineligible to take his seat, the Conservative candidate Malcolm St Clair was declared elected. When the law was changed to allow peerages to be renounced, St Clair resigned the seat and Benn won the Bristol South East by-election 1963.

Result

See also
Lists of United Kingdom by-elections

References

1984 elections in the United Kingdom
1984 in England
1980s in Derbyshire
By-elections to the Parliament of the United Kingdom in Derbyshire constituencies
Chesterfield, Derbyshire
March 1984 events in the United Kingdom
Tony Benn